Zdrawneva was a manor house and estate in Belarus. It is located in the municipality of Ruba (Руба).

The Ilya Yefimovich Repin museum at the Zdravniovo estate was set up in 1988. It is situated in the mansion that used to belong to the 19th-century Ukrainian and Russian artist, Ilya Repin (16 km from Vitebsk, 2 km from the Minsk — St Petersburg Highway).

The father of the artist, Efim Repin, was buried in the nearby village of Sloboda.
The museum contains numerous sketches, aquarelles, icons painted for Sloboda church, as well as photos, letters and books that used to belong to the artist.

References
 Илья Репин. Картины и биография
 Шышанаў В. Невядомае Здраўнёва // Віцебскі сшытак. 2000. № 4. С.90-115.
 Шишанов В.А. РЕПИН И БЕЛАРУСЬ
 Шишанов В. Здравнёво. Исторический облик и музеефикация усадьбы
 Валерий Шишанов ЗДРАВНЁВО: ПОСЛЕ ОКТЯБРЯ 1917
 Художественно-мемориальный музей И.Е. Репина (г.Чугуев)
 Шишанов, В. Там пела птица Сирин... / В.А. Шишанов // Столицы и усадьбы (С.-Петербург). - 2011. - №18. - May - June. - С. 12 - 18.
 Шишанов, В. А. Здравнёвские работы И. Е. Репина в русской художественной критике конца XIX – начала ХХ в. / В. А. Шишанов // Творчество И.Е. Репина и проблемы современного реализма. К 170-летию со дня рождения: материалы Международной научной конференции / ред. кол. Т.В. Юденкова, Л.И. Иовлева, Т.Л. Карпова. – Москва: Гос. Третьяковская галерея, 2015. – С. 117–130.

External links 

 Museum - manor I.E.Repin’s Zdravnevo
 Ilya Repin at Olga's Gallery

Villages in Belarus
Residential buildings in Belarus